Jio Jamai is a Bengali romance comedy film directed by Nehal Dutta and produced by Joydeb Mondal. The film was released on 10 January 2020 under the banner of Jyoti Production.

Plot
Diya works in Jyotirani Devi's Company in Vizag, where all the employees are female. Jyotirani's daughter, Premarati appoints a man, Aditya as regional head of the company. Aditya falls in love with his colleague Diya. One day Aditya realises that Diya's parents are not going through a happy marriage even after 25 years togetherness. This also troubles the relationship between Diya and Aditya. To save the relationship of Diya's parents, the couple decide to act in a different manner. It leads to a series laughter when Adi's uncle comes Vizag.

Cast
 Hiran Chatterjee as Aditya
 Ishani Ghosh as Diya
 Biswajit Chakraborty
 Rajatava Dutta as Diya's father
 Tulika Basu as Diya's mother
 Moumita Chakraborty
 Sumit Ganguly

Soundtrack

References

External links

2020 films
Bengali-language Indian films
Indian romantic comedy films
2020s Bengali-language films
2020 romantic comedy films